Palaeogale is an extinct genus of carnivorous mammal known from the Late Eocene, Oligocene, and Early Miocene of North America, Europe, and Eastern Asia. A small carnivore often associated with the mustelids, Palaeogale might have been similar to living genets, civets, and linsangs.

Time range
The ancestry of Palaeogale remains enigmatic. The genus appears in Europe 32 Ma, after the Grande Coupure, but 35-36 Ma-old (Chadronian NALMA) specimens from Pipestone Springs, Montana, are the oldest known. Palaeogale survived until the late Early Miocene of Europe and the early Early Miocene of East Asia.

 noted that the Palaeogale specimens found in Mongolia are the most plesiomorphic (p1 double-rooted, m2 relatively large, very small overall size) and that the genus probably originated there and migrated to Europe and North America.

Anatomy
Palaeogale was the size of a small mustelid but had a hypercarnivorous dentition and its taxonomic position remains enigmatic. Its dental morphology includes both mustelid (reduced m2) and feliform (slit-like carnassial notch, loss of metaconid on m2, presence of parastyle on P4) features, and Palaeogale is typically placed in Carnivora incertae sedis.

The body mass of Palaeogale sectoria, one of the smallest species, has been estimated to much less than a kilo based on teeth sizes. It was probably semifossorial. P. sanguinarius is slightly larger than P. dorothiae and probably equivalent in age.

Taxonomic history

When  named the genus Palaeogale and two species (P. pulchella and P. fecunda), he only gave a very vague description of these taxa.  described a related species, Mustela minuta, which  thought identical and named Palaeogale minuta, a name that has remained accepted for the type species.

 wrote that when  described the North American species Bunaelurus lagophagus, he distinguished the genus from the European Plesiogale (=Palaeogale in part) based on differences in M2. Simpson, however, thought this molar was "very closely similar" in both genera and synonymized Cope's genus with Palaeogale.
 described a skull which he referred to Cope's genus "Bunaelurus". The skull was found without lower jaws (on which all Bunaelurus specimens were based), but Matthew argued that the correspondence in horizon and size made the "identification reasonably safe." He nevertheless described it as a "Palaeogale with a minute second molar still retained."

 synonymized the then described Palaeogale species from Europe and North America into four taxa based on age occurrence, size difference, presence of M2, and loss of p1.

 created the infraorder Aeluroida to accommodate Palaeogale, Ictidopappus, and Feloidea and argued that these taxa share some derived dental features not present in other feliforms, and retain some primitive dental features that have been modified in other feliforms. Flynn & Galiano, however, placed Ictidopappus as incertae sedis within this infraorder, and pointed out that the grouping of Palaeogale and the Viverravidae in the superfamily Viverravoidea was a hypothetical arrangement.

 accepted Palaeogale as closely related to the family Viverravidae but, because it doesn't share any "unambiguous synapomorphies with either Feliformia or Caniformia", should be considered incertae sedis within Carnivora (together with Stenogale, another very small carnivoran.)

References

Notes

Sources

External links 

Oligocene feliforms
Miocene carnivorans
Eocene genus first appearances
Burdigalian extinctions
Oligocene mammals of Europe
Paleogene France
Fossils of France
Quercy Phosphorites Formation
Oligocene mammals of North America